Kellogg's theorem is a pair of related results in the mathematical study of the regularity of harmonic functions on sufficiently smooth domains by Oliver Dimon Kellogg.

Kellogg's method of proof analyzes the representation of harmonic functions provided by the Poisson kernel, applied to an interior tangent sphere.

In modern presentations, Kellogg's theorem is usually covered as a specific case of the boundary Schauder estimates for elliptic partial differential equations.

See also
Schauder estimates

Sources

Harmonic functions
Potential theory